Wood River is a provincial electoral district for the Legislative Assembly of Saskatchewan, Canada. Located in southern Saskatchewan, the district was created by the Representation Act, 1994 (Saskatchewan) out of parts of the former Assiniboia-Gravelbourg and Shaunavon constituencies. The district takes its name from the R.M. of Wood River, which is located in the center of the constituency.

Communities in the riding include the towns of Assiniboia, Ponteix, Rockglen, Gravelbourg, Mossbank and Lafleche; and the villages of Vanguard, Wood Mountain, Hodgeville, Mankota, Bracken and Val Marie.

Members of the Legislative Assembly

Election results

|
|-

 
|NDP
|Randy Gaudry
|align="right"|961
|align="right"|14.72
|align="right"|-2.54

|- bgcolor="white"
!align="left" colspan=3|Total
!align="right"|6,527
!align="right"|100.00%
!align="right"|

|
|-

 
|NDP
|Steve Ryan
|align="right"|1,320
|align="right"|17.26
|align="right"|-8.72

|- bgcolor="white"
!align="left" colspan=3|Total
!align="right"|7,649
!align="right"|100.00%
!align="right"|

|
|-

 
|NDP
|Trevor Davies
|align="right"|2,043
|align="right"|25.98
|align="right"|+9.02

|- bgcolor="white"
!align="left" colspan=3|Total
!align="right"|7,864
!align="right"|100.00%
!align="right"|

|
|-

 
|NDP
|Robert Anderson
|align="right"|1,142
|align="right"|16.96
|align="right"|-3.55

|- bgcolor="white"
!align="left" colspan=3|Total
!align="right"|6,735
!align="right"|100.00%
!align="right"|

|
|-

 
|NDP
|Robert Anderson
|align="right"|1,632
|align="right"|20.51
|align="right"|-9.89
|- bgcolor="white"
!align="left" colspan=3|Total
!align="right"|7,957
!align="right"|100.00%
!align="right"|

|
|-

 
|NDP
|Allen Engel
|align="right"|2,624
|align="right"|30.40
|align="right"|–
 
|Prog. Conservative
|D.F. (Yogi) Huyghebaert
|align="right"|1,863
|align="right"|21.58
|align="right"|–
|- bgcolor="white"
!align="left" colspan=3|Total
!align="right"|8,633
!align="right"|100.00%
!align="right"|

1999 Election controversy
In 1999, a controversy erupted in the Wood River constituency as Saskatchewan Party candidate Yogi Huyghebaert tied Liberal candidate Glen McPherson. The returning officer cast the deciding vote in favour of McPherson, giving the Liberals four seats. This result was later thrown out in court and a by-election was ordered in June 2000. McPherson did not run and Huyghebaert then won a resounding victory.

References

External links 
Website of the Legislative Assembly of Saskatchewan
Saskatchewan Archives Board – Saskatchewan Election Results By Electoral District

Saskatchewan provincial electoral districts